Cantua pyrifolia is a species of flowering plant in the family Polemoniaceae in the order Ericales and is an endemic to Peru.
It thrives in modestly arid conditions and can be found in Mediterranean climate plant collections.

References

Polemoniaceae
Endemic flora of Peru